KMOX (1120 AM) is a commercial radio station in St. Louis, Missouri. Owned by Audacy, Inc., it is a 50,000 watt Class A clear-channel station with a non-directional signal.  The KMOX studios and offices are on Olive Street at Tucker Boulevard in the Park Pacific Building in St. Louis.  KMOX refers to itself as "NewsRadio 1120 - The Voice of St. Louis."  It is considered the first U.S. station to program all talk shows around the clock.

KMOX's transmitter is located off Route 162 in Pontoon Beach, Illinois.  With a good radio, KMOX's nighttime signal can be heard in most of the Central United States and into Mexico and Canada. Its daytime signal provides at least secondary coverage to most of Eastern Missouri and much of Southern Illinois.  The station is also heard on KEZK's HD2 subchannel and translator 98.7 K254CR.  Along with WIL-FM, KMOX is responsible for the activation of the Greater St. Louis Emergency Alert System for hazardous weather, disaster declarations, etc., and is the EAS primary entry point for eastern Missouri and southern Illinois.

Programming
KMOX airs a talk radio format with blocks of news every morning and in weekday afternoon drive time.  Middays it carries the Dave Glover Show, which replaced The Rush Limbaugh Show. Local talk hosts Charlie Brennan and Amy Marxkors are heard in late mornings and Mark Reardon in early afternoons.  In the evening, the station airs sports.  At night, local host Ryan Wrecker is heard, followed by two syndicated shows, "Our American Stories with Lee Habeeb" and "America in the Morning."

On weekend mornings, all-news blocks start the schedule, followed by programs on money, health, car repair, home improvement and old time radio dramas and comedies.  Some weekend shows are paid brokered programming.  KMOX is the flagship station of the St. Louis Cardinals Baseball team, and was the flagship station for the St. Louis Blues Hockey team through the 2018–2019 season.

KMOX has a large team of local newscasters and reporters, and airs CBS Radio News at the beginning of most hours.  KMOX also has an agreement to share news gathering and weather information with KMOV, the CBS  television Network affiliate for St. Louis.  At one time, KMOX and KMOV (formerly KMOX-TV) were sister stations, both owned by CBS.

History

Early years
KMOX was started in the early 1920s by a group of businessmen who formed a company known as "The Voice of St. Louis, Inc."  According to the station's official website, the KMOX call sign was assigned by the Federal Radio Commission (a forerunner of the Federal Communications Commission). The station's owners wanted KVSL, for "Voice of St. Louis."  The owners also applied for KMO, with MO the abbreviation for Missouri, but those call letters had been in use by another station since 1922, KMO (now KKMO) in Tacoma, Washington.  KMOX signed on the air on December 24, 1925. The "X" was added because the starting date was Christmas Eve, or Xmas Eve.  A local legend states the call letters mean Kirkwood, Missouri On Xmas.

In 1927 the station gave prominent coverage to the Charles Lindbergh flight across the Atlantic in his plane The Spirit of St. Louis. That same year, KMOX became one of the first 16 stations in the CBS Radio Network. Two years later, CBS bought KMOX, and began the process of getting approval to build a 50,000-watt transmitter tower.  When completed, it gave the now-clear-channel station a signal that could be heard at night through much of the U.S.  In the early days of radio, KMOX broadcasts had been picked up in Scotland, New Zealand, the Arctic Circle and South Africa.

In 1933, KMOX covered the first post-Prohibition case of Budweiser beer leaving the Anheuser-Busch St. Louis brewery for the White House, a story carried nationally by CBS.  Through the "Golden Age of Radio," KMOX carried the CBS schedule of dramas, comedies, news, sports, soap operas, game shows and big band broadcasts.  The studios and offices were housed in the Merchandise Mart Building on Washington Street.

TV and FM stations
CBS had planned to have a corporate-owned and operated television station in St. Louis, to pair with KMOX. In 1957, the network originally won an FCC construction permit to build a new station on Channel 11, the last remaining commercial VHF channel in St. Louis. After being approached with an offer, CBS decided in August of that year to instead buy the existing KWK-TV for $4 million. KWK-TV was owned by a group including the publisher of the St. Louis Globe-Democrat.

CBS took control of KWK-TV's operations that March, and changed its call letters to KMOX-TV, sharing the call sign with AM 1120. The original Viacom purchased KMOX-TV from CBS in 1986, and because of an FCC regulation in place then that prohibited TV and radio stations in the same market, but with different ownership from sharing the same callsign, it subsequently amended its call sign to KMOV.

KMOX added an FM station on February 12, 1962.  It broadcast at 103.3 MHz and mostly simulcast the AM station.  By the late 1960s, KMOX-FM was separately programmed, airing an easy listening format, then later shifted to Top 40 as KHTR in 1982, and is currently classic hits KLOU, owned by iHeartMedia, Inc.

In July 1968, CBS opened a new studio and office facility in downtown St. Louis to house KMOX-AM-FM-TV, which until that point had been operating from separate locations.  The radio stations had been headquartered near Forest Park. KMOX-TV moved from Cole Street into the new facility, known as One Memorial Drive, and remains there to the present day.

Talk radio pioneer
As network programming shifted from radio to television in the 1950s, KMOX scheduled a full service format of talk shows, news, and middle of the road (later adult contemporary) music.  In 1955, Robert Hyland Jr. became KMOX's general manager, a role he held for nearly forty years. It was Hyland who leveraged KMOX's relationship with the Cardinals, signing many lucrative advertising contracts with local businesses.

Hyland made the decision in 1960 to eliminate the station's afternoon music programming, the last of the non-talk shows.  That made KMOX the first full-time talk radio station in the country, helping keep KMOX dominance in the St. Louis radio market for many decades. On February 29, 1960, Jack Buck hosted the first "At Your Service" program, which included an interview with former First Lady Eleanor Roosevelt. That program, like the sports and talk shows that soon followed, pioneered a format for radio featuring news maker interviews, guest appearances, and calls from listeners.

After Hyland died in 1992, Rod Zimmerman was named general manager. He departed in 1998 to manage CBS station WBBM Radio in Chicago.

KMOX picked up Costas Coast to Coast in 1994. Also, in July of that year Bob Costas began hosting a sports call-in show on the station.

Karen Carroll was general manager from 1998 until 2003, when Tom Langmyer was promoted to the top position. Langmyer left in 2005 to become vice president/general manager of WGN Radio in Chicago. Dave Ervin managed the station from 2005 to 2008. Becky Domyan, who also oversees sister stations KEZK and KYKY is the station's current Market Manager & Sr. Vice President for Entercom.

KMOX started broadcasting in HD Radio in May 2006.  For many years, KMOX broadcast using C-QUAM's AM Stereo technology, but stereo transmissions ended in the spring of 2000.

On January 30, 2012, Jon Grayson's "Overnight America," based at KMOX, and also airing on CBS stations WCCO Minneapolis and KDKA Pittsburgh, became a nationally syndicated program with several dozen stations airing it across the country.  The syndication was discontinued in 2017, but the show continues to air late nights on KMOX.

Entercom/Audacy ownership
On February 2, 2017, CBS Radio announced it would merge with Entercom. The merger was approved on November 9, 2017, and was consummated on the 17th.  The Entercom acquisition ended KMOX's 88 years of CBS ownership.

KMOX held the distinction of holding the record for consecutive number one Arbitron ratings books in the United States. The station was consistently the top rated radio station in St. Louis since the ratings service began in 1972 until 2010, when WARH took over the top spot in the Arbs.  KMOX remains the top rated AM station, consistently in the top ten in the Nielsen ratings for St. Louis.

KMOX carried the Rush Limbaugh show weekdays for several decades.  The program was sometimes pre-empted by St. Louis Cardinals' afternoon baseball games.  Limbaugh was one of the few non-local shows broadcast on the station.  It is syndicated by Premiere Networks, a subsidiary of iHeartMedia.  KMOX also carries two non-local shows overnight, "Our American Stories with Lee Habeeb" and "America in the Morning."  Habeeb is a programmer with the Salem Radio Network.  America in the Morning is supplied by Westwood One, a subsidiary of Cumulus Media.

For the past 21 years, KMOX has hosted a holiday radio program, in which KMOX personalities perform an old-time radio show in front of a live audience.

On March 22, 2021, KMOX added an FM simulcast on 98.7 FM K254CR, a translator formerly used for KFTK (AM), then temporarily for KFTK-FM. This translator provides coverage to the inner ring suburbs of St. Louis.  KMOX also added The Dave Glover Show to their schedule, which previously aired on KFTK for the past two years, and following Limbaugh's death elected to launch a new, local show hosted by longtime news reporter Carol Daniel in its lunchtime timeslot.

Sports

KMOX has had a long history of broadcasting sports. In 1926, it aired the Cardinals-Yankees World Series, and starting the next season the station began airing St. Louis Cardinals' games.

During the 1930s and 1940s, KMOX was one of several St. Louis stations broadcasting both the Cardinals and St. Louis Browns baseball games. KMOX lost broadcasting rights in 1948 when a new Cardinals radio network was formed by the team, but by the 1950s, it became the flagship station of that network (in part due to its clear channel status).

KMOX's most famous sports broadcaster was Jack Buck, who was the station's year-round sports director during the years he was also calling baseball and football for the CBS radio and television networks.  Another famous announcer was Harry Caray, who did play-by-play for Cardinals' baseball from 1945 through 1969. Dan Kelly was hired in 1968 to broadcast the new Blues hockey team and became the voice of hockey in the city until his death in 1989: his son John is the team's TV commentator today. Bill Wilkerson, the station's football caller, was the first black man to be the lead announcer for an NFL team when he took over commentary duties for the football Cardinals in 1973: three years later, he would assume the same position for Mizzou football, where once again he would be one of the first black primary broadcasters in major college athletics, only leaving the post in 1993 when he was poached by KTRS. Bob Costas did play-by-play on KMOX for the Spirits of St. Louis of the American Basketball Association from 1974 until the ABA-NBA merger in June 1976.

At times, the station's emphasis had shifted away from broadcasting St. Louis professional sports teams. In 2000, the St. Louis Blues hockey team moved to KTRS after having been on KMOX for all but three of the team's 33 seasons (1967–2000), but the games returned starting in the 2006–07 season. The St. Louis Blues moved to WXOS starting in the 2019–2020 season. In 2006, the Cardinals' broadcasts moved to KTRS after 52 seasons on KMOX (1954–2005) after the team purchased controlling interest in KTRS.
On September 1, 2010, the Cardinals announced the return of broadcasts to KMOX, starting in the 2011 baseball season.
KMOX aired University of Missouri Tigers Football and basketball games for many years, and was the flagship of their radio network until the 1990s. Starting in  2011, the Tigers moved their basketball, football, and news & talk programs to 550 KTRS.

The station continues to host sports programming such as "Sports Open Line," heard Monday through Friday nights, beginning at 6 p.m.  Matt Pauley is the main host.  "Sports on a Sunday Morning" airs from 10 a.m. to noon on Sundays.

Live Play by Play Sports on KMOX
St. Louis Blues hockey (1967–1985, 1988–2000, 2006–2019, spillover games on co-owned KYKY)
St. Louis Cardinals baseball (1928–1948, 1954–2005, 2011–present)
St. Louis Cardinals football (1960–1987)
St. Louis Hawks basketball (1955–1968)

FM translator

Personalities
Notable current and past KMOX broadcasters include:

 Buddy Blattner
 Jack Buck (1954–58, 1961–2001)
 Joe Buck
 Harry Caray (1945–69)
 Jack Carney (1971–83)
 John Carney
 Kelly Chase
 Bob Costas (1974–81)
 Rex Davis  (1948-1981)
 Dizzy Dean (1941–48)
 Dan Dierdorf (1984–86)
 Art Fleming (1980–92)
 Joe Garagiola
 Bob Hardy (1960-1993)
 Charles Jaco
 Charlie Brennan (1988–2022)
 Ron Jacober
 Randy Karraker (1984 -2001)
 Anne Keefe' 
 Dan Kelly (1967–88)
 Dan P. Kelly
 Gus Kyle
 France Laux, The Sporting News'' first recipient
 Doug McElvein 1993-2015
 Emmett McAuliffe
 Bernie Miklasz
 John Rooney (2006–present)
 Mike Shannon (1972–2021)
 Bob Starr (1972–79)
 Jim White (1969–99)
 Bill Wilkerson (1969–96)

References

External links

Timeline and stories about KMOX from a website maintained by a St. Louis radio historian
A KMOX QSL card circa 1977
FCC History Cards for KMOX
KMOX Collection Finding Aid at the St. Louis Public Library

Radio stations established in 1925
MOX
Sports in St. Louis
Spirits of St. Louis
News and talk radio stations in the United States
1925 establishments in Missouri
Audacy, Inc. radio stations
Clear-channel radio stations